The Unity of the People is a Centre-right nationalist political party in South Ossetia, a partially recognized Caucasian republic, considered by most countries to be a part of Georgia. The party is led by Vladimir Kelekhsaev.

In the party's 2019 congress they focused on agricultural issues stating that “The most important thing today is attention to agricultural issues, it is necessary to determine the fertility of the land, which will allow developing horticulture, viticulture and raising cattle. Today, 90% of agricultural products are imported from Russia. We must be self-sufficient,”

References

Political parties in South Ossetia